Dashtchi (also Romanized as Dashtchī) is a village in Zazeran Rural District, in the Central District of Falavarjan County, Isfahan Province, Iran. At the 2006 census, its population was 1,668, in 431 families.

References 

Populated places in Falavarjan County